Bess Rous is an American actress. On television, she was featured as a series regular on the first season of the TNT crime drama Murder in the First (2014) and the Yahoo! Screen science fiction comedy Other Space (2015). She also appeared in the 2016 reboot of Ghostbusters.

Early life and education
Rous was born in Short Hills, New Jersey. In her childhood, she was an ice dancer and trained at the University of Delaware's Ice Skating Science Development Center in Newark, Delaware when she was 15. She graduated from the Mason Gross School of the Arts at Rutgers University with a BFA in Acting and also holds a certificate from the London Academy of Theatre.

Career
Rous' first onscreen role was a guest appearance on the series Third Watch in 2004. This was followed by further guest spots on series such as Law & Order, Mad Men, Gossip Girl, Law & Order: Special Victims Unit, The Mentalist, and Blue Bloods. She made her film debut in What Just Happened in 2008.

In 2014, Rous landed her first series regular role in the first season of Murder in the First as an employee and mistress of a Silicon Valley prodigy portrayed by Tom Felton. The following year, she appeared as a series regular on Yahoo! Screen's Other Space as Karen  Lipinski, the temperamental first officer of an exploratory spaceship. The series aired for one season before Yahoo! Screen was shut down.

Subsequent roles for Rous have included guest appearances on Castle, Under the Dome, Rosewood, Chicago Med, Grey's Anatomy, Proven Innocent, Deputy, and FBI. She also appeared in the 2016 reboot of Ghostbusters, reuniting her with Other Space creator Paul Feig and cast members Neil Casey, Eugene Cordero, Karan Soni, and Milana Vayntrub.

Personal life
Outside of her acting career, Rous is certified by the Alzheimer's Association Speaker's Bureau and serves as a volunteer helping to educate and assist patients and their families who are affected by the disease.

Filmography

Film

Television

References

External links
 

21st-century American actresses
Actresses from New Jersey
American film actresses
American television actresses
Living people
People from Millburn, New Jersey
Mason Gross School of the Arts alumni
Year of birth missing (living people)